The 2008–09 Alabama State Hornets basketball team represented Alabama State University in the 2008–09 NCAA Division I men's basketball season. The Hornets, led by head coach Lewis Jackson, played their home games at Dunn–Oliver Acadome in Montgomery, Alabama, as members of the Southwestern Athletic Conference. The Hornets won the SWAC regular season title, then won the 2009 SWAC tournament to earn an automatic bid to the NCAA tournament as a 16th seed in the Midwest region. Alabama State played in the Opening Round game, losing to Morehead State, 58–43.

Roster 

Source

Schedule and results

|-
!colspan=12 style=|Regular season

|-
!colspan=12 style=| SWAC tournament

|-
!colspan=12 style=| NCAA tournament

Source

References

Alabama State Hornets basketball seasons
Alabama State
Alabama State
Alabama State Hornets men's basketball
Alabama State Hornets men's basketball